The Green Valley Historic District is a national historic district which is located in East Marlborough Township and Newlin Township, Chester County, Pennsylvania.

It was added to the National Register of Historic Places in 1985.

History and architectural features
The Green Valley Historic District encompasses fourteen contributing buildings, one contributing site and two contributing structures. Located in rural Chester County, it includes a variety of vernacular stone and log farmhouses, farm outbuildings, mill sites, and lime kilns. 

Notable properties include the Green Valley Farm, which was built sometime around 1810, the Green Valley School, which was erected in 1862, the William Hall log house, which was built sometime around 1795, Harvey's Mill house and mill site, which were built sometime around 1780, and the Robinson homestead, which was built sometime around 1820.

This district was added to the National Register of Historic Places in 1985.

References

Historic districts on the National Register of Historic Places in Pennsylvania
Historic districts in Chester County, Pennsylvania
National Register of Historic Places in Chester County, Pennsylvania